Sforzando may refer to:

Sforzando (musical direction), in musical notation to play a note with sudden, strong emphasis
Sforzando (band), a band from Melbourne, Australia
"Sforzando!", a 1996 song by Sebadoh from Harmacy